Ultimate Origins is a comic book limited series published by Marvel Comics, released in June 2008. It falls under Marvel's Ultimate Marvel imprint. It is written by Brian Bendis and illustrated by Butch Guice. It is intended to be a chapter in the development of Ultimatum, a crossover event that begun in September 2008.

Jeph Loeb has stated in an interview with Comic Book Resources: "What Ultimate Origin is going to do is sort of tell us how it all began. ... The Ultimate Universe isn't very old, so this isn't a cosmic story. You're not going to see the birth of a planet. What you'll see is how the superhero community was introduced into the human population. So you'll learn the importance of things like the Super Soldier program, which has been hinted at in Ultimate Spider-Man and Ultimates 1 and 2. Now, Brian is going to connect the dots."

Plot summary
The story opens with a scene from Ultimate Marvel Team-Up 3, where Spider-Man confronts a deranged Bruce Banner, who is agitated and tells Spider-Man "it's all connected". General Ross arrives, and despite Spider-Man's attempts to defuse the situation, Banner transforms into the Hulk and escapes.

We then cut to 1942, at the Battle of the Tenaru. An American "super-soldier", who is just a normal GI with a uniform that resembles the costume of Citizen V from Earth-616, rallies his men in the face of a Japanese attack. He is then killed in combat, with his blood staining the American flag. A photograph of this image is released around the world, and President Roosevelt demands a true super-soldier from his advisors, rather than a normal man in costume.

A year later, during the invasion of Sicily, three soldiers,  (American privates Fisk (the grandfather of The Kingpin) and Nicholas Fury, and Canadian soldier James Howlett), attempt to loot a house. Military police arrive and arrest all three. Fisk is grazed by a bullet, while Fury and Howlett, despite the latter's protests that he's Canadian, are shipped off to separate unknown locations.

Fury is selected to be the next test subject for Project Rebirth, as the results from blood tests most closely match that of "subject 22", the most successful of previous test subjects. He is injected with a serum that gives him super strength, which he uses to free himself and the other prisoners. This is permitted since the project scientists decide that they have all the information that they need for now. Elsewhere, Howlett awakens within the "Weapon X" complex, in a tank of liquid. He escapes the complex, but is shot as he nears freedom. Howlett's wound heals completely and he is recaptured. Dr. Cornelius, Weapon X's head scientist, explains that in attempting to create their own version of Captain America, Weapon X accidentally discovered a genome that, when genetically altered, grants the person carrying it various abilities based on their DNA. He calls these altered humans "mutants", (with Howlett as "Mutant Zero"), and states that mutants will be how humanity survives.

The story then alternates between the discovery of the artifact known as the Watcher by Captain Carol Danvers of Project Pegasus, a government warehouse for objects with mysterious origins and, usually, mass destructive capacity. and events leading to the birth of Captain America. A lame young man, Steven Rogers, is recruited by Dum Dum Dugan into the Project Rebirth Super-Soldier Program. Through many different treatments, Steven Rogers is reborn as the ultimate super-soldier and leaves his fiance Gail behind to start his life in World War II.

Later, a teenaged Erik Lehnsherr visits the Weapon X complex and sets Wolverine free, letting the captive Canadian soldier know that his name is James. When Magneto's mother, who works at the complex, tries to stop him, he murders her and proclaims that he hopes there "is a hell." Before his mother's death, she justifies her work with Weapon X by declaring that she only wanted to find a cure for Erik and the others. Even later in Erik's life, he reads a book published by Charles Xavier and is determined to meet him. Showing up in the class that Xavier teaches, they soon realize that Charles's telepathic powers do not work on Magneto. They discuss the theories involved with having "mutanity" accepted and eventually relocate to the Savage Land, where Magneto's Brotherhood is waiting to be trained by the two.

Sometime later, Nick Fury is questioned by General Ross while lying in a hospital bed after apparently being saved from an unspecified wartime threat by Wolverine. General Ross feverishly questions him about his previous involvement with the mutant known as Weapon X and the nature of Nick Fury's unique physiology. After Fury dismisses an offer to become the "new" Captain America (in replacement of the then-missing in action original), he wonders about his usefulness in other ways.

The story skips forward for a brief synopsis of Project Rebirth 2 and important characters, including Nick Fury, Dr. Franklin Storm, Bruce Banner, Dr. Hank Pym, and Dr. Richard Parker. During this time, Dr. Storm is contracted to work with the Baxter Building project as well as Project Rebirth. Their work with the facility uses a vial of Fury's blood. Fury's identity as the donor is concealed from all scientific participants, although Parker suspects the truth. When Banner seems to have had a breakthrough, he and Dr. Pym decide to try it on themselves, starting with Banner. The trial goes awry and Banner, now as the Hulk, destroys the building and severely injures Richard and Mary Parker.  The sight of the infant Peter Parker in his mother's arms shocks Banner back to himself and he is quickly subdued by Fury. Taking the infant in to his arms, he whispers that it is good that Peter is young, because he won't remember a thing.

Later, Fury infiltrates the Weapon X project, and, after the shock of the environment sinks in, Fury realizes that nobody should ever know of human involvement in the mutant gene. He kills all of the scientists and their experimental subjects. The only mutant to survive is T'Challa, whom Fury feels a connection with due to their tragic pasts.

Charles Xavier is next seen being speared in the back as an act of retaliation by Magneto, who claims Charles tried to attack him in his own mind. Magneto speaks of the mutant race's fate to ascend like gods over homo sapiens and his belief that God willed this to be.

In the present day, the Watchers speak through Sue Storm and foretell certain doom that awaits before picking a herald. While the Fantastic Four wonder who this could be, Rick Jones is found by his family glowing in the backyard.

Collected edition

References

External links
Review of Ultimate Origins #1, Comics Bulletin
Two reviews, Comic Book Resources

2008 comics debuts
Comics by Brian Michael Bendis